Mirella Bentivoglio (28 March 1922 – 23 March 2017) was an Italian sculptor, poet, performance artist and curator.

In the 1960s she joined the international concrete poetry movement. She participated in exhibitions all over the world, including the Venice Biennale (eight times from 1969 to 2001) and the Museum of Modern Art (1992).

Biography
Mirella Bentivoglio was born in Klagenfurt, Austria, to Italian parents. Her father, Ernesto Bertarelli, was a scientist and professor at the University of Pavia and an avid collector of books. Mirella grew up in Milan and studied in Italy, Switzerland and England.

Although her studies were interrupted by World War II, she continued to expand her knowledge using her father's extensive library.

She started her career as a poet when she was very young. She published her first collection of poems, Giardino, in 1943, but she waited until 1968 to publish her second poetry book. This unusually long period between the two publications was intentional, the result of a dissatisfaction with the rigidity of the printed word and its inability to fully represent the open and multifaceted experiences from which the poems emerged.
In 1963 she published her first work as an art critic, a monographic study on the Lithuanian-born American artist Ben Shahn.

As an art critic, artist and poet, in the 1960s she began to focus on the expressive visualization of language. At that time she joined the concrete poetry movement, and she started using alphabetic elements to create images. Examples of this creative period include Successo (Success), 1968, and Pagina-finestra (Window-Page), 1971.

Bentivoglio also joined the visual poetry movement, that mix linguistic and iconic elements. Fiore Nero (Black Flower), 1971, well represents her visual poetry work.

In the 1970s, Bentivoglio became particularly fascinated with the letters E and O, that in Italian respectively stand for the English words "and" and "or". E became a sign for community, connection, while O became a sign for identity and individuality. Few years later, she became increasingly involved with sculpture and performance art, making the letters evolve in three-dimensional forms: the E became the open book, while the O became the egg.

Her first sculptural work that uses the book and the egg is Poema Totale (Total Poem), 1974. These two images recur in many of her later works, and appear in one of her most remarkable work, L'Ovo di Gubbio (The Egg of Gubbio), from 1976.

In 1976 Bentivoglio created another work for the Italian town of Gubbio, titled Poesia all'albero (The Poem to the Tree). This performance art piece consisted of hoisting in the main square of the town a tree and inviting passers-by to write something on a piece of paper, and then to attach it to the tree. Bentivoglio then collected the papers and chose some among them to create a unique poem.

Bentivoglio was awarded the Silver Plate of the President of the Italian Republic in 2002.

All Bentivoglio's work is pervaded by a wry critique of Western societies, their patriarchal structures, obsession with material consumption, pollution of the environment and celebration of power over compassion. As a curator and a critic, she always worked to promote women artists.

For the artist's 90th birthday, the National Gallery of Contemporary Art in Rome organized a retrospective about her work.

At the time of her death, on 23 March 2017, Bentivoglio made her home and worked in Rome.  She was 94.

Selected exhibitions

Solo exhibitions 
1971, Schwarz Gallery in Milan
1973, São Paulo Art Biennial; Klingspor Museum, Offenbach
1977, Italian House in Rochester, New York;  The Poetry Collection, University of Buffalo
1978, Italian Cultural Institute, New York
1981, Metronom, Barcelona
1987, Tower of the Leper, Aosta
1988, Writers' Forum, London
1991, Art Center, Edewecht
1999, National Museum of Women in the Arts, Washington DC

Collective exhibitions 
2012, Poesia Visiva, Museo di Arte Moderna e Contemporanea di Trento e Rovereto
1969, 1972, 1978, 1980, 1986, 1995, Venice Biennale
1973, 1981, 1994, São Paulo Art Biennial
1982, documenta, Kassel
1978, 1981, 1982, Centre Georges Pompidou, Paris
1986, XI Quadriennale Nazionale di Roma
1992, Museum of Modern Art, New York
1994, Peggy Guggenheim Collection, Venice

Bibliography 

The Visual Poetry of Mirella Bentivoglio, Edizioni De Luca, 1999, 
Bentivoglio Mirella; Zoccoli Franca, Le futuriste italiane nelle arti visive, De Luca Editori d'Arte, 2008, 
 Riccardo Boglione. Il colpo di dado di Mirella Bentivoglio. Museo Comunale d'Arte moderna, Senigallia, 2012.
 Mirella Bentivoglio, Jocalia. Trenta ornamenti per il corpo, Ilisso Publisher, 1999. 
 Mirella Bentivoglio, La guerra in piccolo. Scritti ritrovati 1943-45, De Luca Editori d'Arte, 2015.

Sources
 Frances K. Pohl, "Language / Image / Object: The Work of Mirella Bentivoglio", Woman's Art Journal, Vol.6: No.1 (Spring - Summer, 1985), pp. 17–22 accessed at  - subscription only
 The Visual Poetry of Mirella Bentivoglio, National Museum of Women in the Arts, 1999,

References

External links
Mirella Bentivoglio Enciclopedia Delle Donne in Italian

1922 births
2017 deaths
20th-century Italian sculptors
21st-century Italian sculptors
20th-century Italian women artists
21st-century Italian women artists
Italian contemporary artists
Italian women poets
Italian women sculptors
Artists from Klagenfurt
Visual poets